This is a list of electoral results for the Electoral district of Prahran in Victorian state elections.

Members for Prahran

Election results

Elections in the 2020s

Elections in the 2010s

Elections in the 2000s

Elections in the 1990s

Elections in the 1980s

Elections in the 1970s

Elections in the 1960s

Elections in the 1950s

Elections in the 1940s

 Preferences were not distributed.

|- style="background-color:#E9E9E9"
! colspan="6" style="text-align:left;" |After distribution of preferences

 Preferences were not distributed to completion.

Elections in the 1930s

Elections in the 1920s

 Two party preferred vote was estimated.

Elections in the 1910s

References

 

Victoria (Australia) state electoral results by district